The Solor Archipelago is a group of islands in the Lesser Sunda Islands, Indonesia, lying to the east of Flores and to the west of the Alor Strait and the Alor Archipelago. To the north is the west part of the Banda Sea, while to the south across the Savu Sea lies the island of Timor. The largest islands are, from west to east, Solor, Adonara, and Lembata (formerly known as Lomblen), although there are many small islands as well.

Administratively, the islands of Solor and Adonara are included within the East Flores Regency, while Lembata (with smaller offshore islands) forms its own regency (kabupaten), the Lembata Regency. Both regencies lie within the province of East Nusa Tenggara. The islands are listed below with their areas and their populations at the 2010 Census and the 2020 Census, and according to the official estimates for mid 2021, together with the number of administrative districts (kecamatan) on each island.

In addition to the national language of Indonesian, the population also speak Lamaholot as a lingua franca. There are also many local languages, for example Adonara which is spoken on Adonara and Solor.

On the South coast of Lembata, the village of Lamalera (pop. 2,500) is known for its hunting of the sperm whale and other deep-sea species.  This is allowed under International Whaling Commission regulations around aboriginal whaling but conservationists worry that commercial whaling is also done.  Lamalera and Lamakera (on the neighbouring island of Solor) are the last two remaining Indonesian whaling communities.

References 

 
Archipelagoes of Indonesia
Lesser Sunda Islands
Landforms of East Nusa Tenggara
Inner Banda Arc
Populated places in Indonesia